T. Henry Sergeaunt (2 January 1891 – 1959) was an English footballer who played for Hull City and Durham City in the Football League.

References

1891 births
1959 deaths
Footballers from Newcastle upon Tyne
English footballers
Association football inside forwards
Felling Colliery A.F.C. players
Hull City A.F.C. players
Brighton & Hove Albion F.C. players
Seaton Delaval F.C. players
Durham City A.F.C. players
English Football League players
Date of death missing
Place of death missing